In Meitei mythology and folklore, Kabui Salang Maiba may refer to:
 a maiba who turned into Keibu Keioiba (Kabui Keioiba) 
 a maiba of Kabui Salang community mentioned in the epic story of Khamba Thoibi
 a maiba who killed Poubi Lai

Meitei folklore
Meitei  mythology
Priests